Cyanophrys bertha is a species of butterfly in the family Lycaenidae first described by E. Dukinfield Jones in 1912. It is endemic to Brazil.

References

bertha
Fauna of Brazil
Butterflies described in 1912
Endemic fauna of Brazil
Lycaenidae of South America
Taxonomy articles created by Polbot